Serafim Batzoglou is Chief Data Officer at Seer Inc. Prior to that he was Chief Data Officer at insitro, VP of computational genomics at Illumina, and professor of  computer science at Stanford University between 2001 and 2016. His lab focused on computational genomics with special interest in developing algorithms, machine learning methods, and systems for the analysis of large scale genomic data. He has also been involved with the Human Genome Project and ENCODE.

Background 
Batzoglou did his undergraduate studies at MIT and obtained his PhD in Computer Science from MIT in 2000 under the supervision of Bonnie Berger.

Awards 
 ISCB Fellow (2020)
 ISCB Innovator Award (2016)
 Sloan Research Fellowship, Alfred P. Sloan Foundation
 Career Award in Computer Science, National Science Foundation
 Top 100 Young Technology Innovators, MIT Technology Review
 Best Paper Award, ISMB (2003)

References 

Living people
Stanford University faculty
Massachusetts Institute of Technology alumni
Computer scientists
Human Genome Project scientists
Year of birth missing (living people)